The 2003 Rink Hockey World Championship was the 36th edition of the Rink Hockey World Championship, held between 27 September and 4 October 2003, in Oliveira de Azeméis, Portugal.

Format

The competition was disputed by 16 countries, divided in four groups of 4 teams each one.

Every game lasted 40 minutes, divided in 2 parts of 20 minutes.

Matches

Group stage

Group A

Group B

Group C

Group D

Championship Knockout stage

5th place bracket

9th to 16th place Knockout stage

13th place bracket

Final standings

External links
2003 Rink Hockey World Championship Official Site
Rink Hockey Data

Roller Hockey World Cup
Rink Hockey World Championship
World Championship
Rink Hockey World Championship